Karl Tewes (18 August 1886 – 7 September 1968) was a German international footballer.

References

External links

1886 births
1968 deaths
Association football midfielders
German footballers
Germany international footballers